Belgium has competed at most editions of the World Games after making its first appearance at the 1981 Games.

List of medalists

Official sports

Invitational sports

World Games